Luke Campbell (born 16 February 1995 in New Zealand) is a New Zealand rugby union player who plays for the  in Super Rugby. His playing position is scrum-half. He also plays for the New Orleans Gold in Major League Rugby (MLR) in the U.S. 

He was named in the Hurricanes squad for the 2021 Super Rugby Aotearoa season. He was also a member of the  2020 Mitre 10 Cup squad.

Reference list

External links
itsrugby.co.uk profile

1995 births
New Zealand rugby union players
Living people
Rugby union scrum-halves
Bay of Plenty rugby union players
Hurricanes (rugby union) players
RC Narbonne players
Manawatu rugby union players
New Orleans Gold players